Progressive Episcopalians of Pittsburgh (PEP), a member of the Via Media USA alliance, is a group of laypersons and clergy in the Episcopal Diocese of Pittsburgh that represents the interests of moderate to liberal churches and individuals within the diocese. The group has essentially served as the center-left opposition to Bishop Robert Duncan.

Founded initially to oppose several resolutions at a diocesan convention, the group has grown in size and scope. Its members were instrumental in the formation of Via Media USA, and have often spoken for liberals throughout the church in the national media.

PEP has had several prominent members:
 The Rt. Rev. Walter Righter, who was tried for heresy for ordaining a gay man.
 Joan R. Gundersen, current president, historian and author, president of Episcopal Women's History Project.
 Lionel Deimel, former president of PEP and an oft-quoted advocate for progressive Christianity.
 Christopher Wilkins, vice president and facilitator of Via Media USA.
 The Rev. Dr. Harold Lewis, Rector Emeritus of Calvary Church, Shadyside, which sued the Diocese of Pittsburgh for attempting to circumvent the Dennis Canon.

References

 New York Times article
 Post-Gazette article
 Toronto Star article
 Washington Post article

External links
 Progressive Episcopalians of Pittsburgh official site

Anglicanism